Møre is a local Norwegian newspaper published once a week in Smøla in Møre og Romsdal county. 

Møre covers news in the municipalities of Volda and Ørsta as well as throughout Møre og Romsdal. It is Norway's oldest local newspaper that is still published, and it is the second-oldest newspaper in the country, after Adresseavisen. The newspaper is edited by Tore Aarflot. It is published three times a week (Tuesdays, Thursdays, and Saturdays) and all of the edited material is published in Nynorsk.

The newspaper is owned by the company Aarflots Prenteverk, which runs the media house, where the newspaper is a major component of its operations. The business is also engaged in graphic design and printing.

In 1808 the farmer, bailiff, politician, and postmaster Sivert Aarflot received permission to start printing at Ekset in Volda. He started printing in 1809, and in 1810 he produced his first newspaper: Norsk Landboeblad. This newspaper changed its name many times, and since 1902 or 1903 it has been called Møre.

The Sivert Aarflot Museum is dedicated to the story of Sivert Aarflot and his press and newspaper. Among other items, the museum contains his first press and a somewhat more modern screw press. The museum was opened following an agreement with company CEO Tore Aarflot.

Circulation
According to the Norwegian Audit Bureau of Circulations and National Association of Local Newspapers, Møre has had the following annual circulation:
2004: 3,775
2005: 3,746
2006: 3,759
2007: 3,752
2008: 3,735
2009: 3,722
2010: 3,690
2011: 3,650
2012: 3,578
2013: 3,449
2014: 3,373
2015: 3,317
2016: 3,195

References

External links
Møre home page

Newspapers published in Norway
Norwegian-language newspapers
Sunnmøre
Mass media in Møre og Romsdal
Publications established in 1810
Nynorsk